Parmelia asiatica is a species of lichen in the family Parmeliaceae. Known from China, it was described as new to science in 2011 by lichenologists Ana Crespo and Pradeep Divakar.

References

asiatica
Lichen species
Lichens described in 2011
Lichens of China
Taxa named by Ana Crespo
Taxa named by Pradeep Kumar Divakar